Juan Carlos Jacinto Jiménez (born July 2, 1978) is a Dominican judoka, who played for the extra and half lightweight categories. He won the bronze medal for the 60 kg class at the 1999 Pan American Games in Winnipeg, Manitoba, Canada.

Background
Jacinto made his official debut for the 2000 Summer Olympics in Sydney, where he competed in the men's 60 kg class. He lost the first preliminary match to Algeria's Omar Rebahi, who successfully scored a single yuko within the five-minute period.

At the 2004 Summer Olympics in Athens, Jacinto switched to a heavier class by competing in the men's half-heavyweight division, despite weighing 68 kilograms. He lost again in his first preliminary match to Kazakhstan's Muratbek Kipshakbayev this time, by a waza-ari (half-point) and a sukui nage (double leg takedown).

Beijing Olympics
At the 2008 Summer Olympics in Beijing, Jacinto competed for the second time in the men's 66 kg class. He received a bye for the second preliminary match, before losing out by an automatic ippon to Japan's Masato Uchishiba, who eventually won a gold medal in this event. Unlike his two previous Olympic games, Jacinto offered another shot for the bronze medal by entering the repechage rounds. Unfortunately, he was defeated in his first match by Iran's Arash Miresmaeili, who successfully scored a yuko and a koka, before the five-minute period had ended.

References

External links

NBC Olympics Profile

1978 births
Living people
Dominican Republic male judoka
Olympic judoka of the Dominican Republic
Judoka at the 2000 Summer Olympics
Judoka at the 2004 Summer Olympics
Judoka at the 2008 Summer Olympics
Pan American Games bronze medalists for the Dominican Republic
Pan American Games medalists in judo
Judoka at the 1999 Pan American Games
Medalists at the 1999 Pan American Games